Paul James Stevens (born 31 July 1973) is a former English cricketer, born in Eastbourne, Sussex. A right-handed batsman and wicket-keeper, he played a few times for Sussex County Cricket Club's Second XI in 1992, and made eight List A appearances for the Sussex Cricket Board team between 1998 and 2002, all in the NatWest Trophy and its successor the C&G Trophy.

His highest score was a 62 against Shropshire in 2001. His last game was in 2002 when he sent down three overs for 18 runs without taking a wicket. He took 11 catches, and made one stumping, the latter being that of Herefordshire's Neeraj Prabhu.

External links
 
 Statistical summary from CricketArchive

1973 births
Living people
English cricketers
Sportspeople from Eastbourne
Sussex Cricket Board cricketers
Wicket-keepers